Main Tere Liye is a 1988 Indian Bollywood film directed by Vijay Anand and produced by Dev Anand. It stars Rajendra Kumar, Asha Parekh, Suneil Anand, Meenakshi Seshadri in lead roles.

Cast
 Rajendra Kumar as Shiva
 Asha Parekh as Preeti
 Suneil Anand as Ajit
 Meenakshi Seshadri as Rinku 
 Gulshan Grover as Harish Saxena "Harry"
 Om Shivpuri as Makkad Saxena
 Iftekhar as Advocate Mehta
 Sudhir as Dinesh Saxena

Production
Suniel Anand, Dev Anand's son, was cast in the film, in one of the only films he acted in. According to Suparn Verma from Rediff.com, the film "made to kickstart the dead-on-arrival career of Dev Anand's son, Suniel", without much success. This idea was repeated by Asha Parekh, who said Dev Anand produced the film "to launch his son Suneil".

Soundtrack
The film's music is composed by Bappi Lahiri. Vijay Anand wrote the lyrics.

Reception
The film's music was received well, but it did not do well at the box office. Bombay: The City Magazine worte of the film's music, "There are six songs in this collection and despite Bappi Lahiri's uncontrollable urge to give them the rock-n-roll form, at least four of them stand out."

References

External links
 

1980s Hindi-language films
Films directed by Vijay Anand
Films scored by Bappi Lahiri